Emilija Manninen (born 22 January 1981) is an Estonian female hurdler. She has represented Estonia at the  Deaflympics in 1997, 2001, 2005, 2009 and 2013.

Emilija won her first Deaflympic medal, which was a bronze medal at the 2001 Summer Deaflympics in the women's 400m hurdles. She also claimed a silver medal in the 400m hurdles during the 2009 Summer Deaflympics, which was her second medal in the women's 400m hurdles. Emilija Manninen set a new Deaflympic record for the women's 400m hurdles with a record time of 1:01.62 during the 2013 Summer Deaflympics after earning a gold medal in the particular event.

References 

1981 births
Living people
Estonian female hurdlers
Estonian female sprinters
Deaf competitors in athletics
Deaflympic athletes (track and field)
Estonian deaf people